A list of films produced in Paraguay. Paraguay produced more than a hundred feature films, including fiction and documentaries, including several important co-productions.

1950s

1960s

1970s

1980s

1990s

2000s

2010s

2020s

List of Paraguayan short films 

 Alma Paraguaya (1925)
 Asunción a Cuatro Tiempos (1997)
 Cachorros de León, la Batalla de Boqueron (1997)
 La Cajita Feliz (2004)
 Campaña Electoral Con la Presencia de Eligio Ayala (1927)
 Candida (2003)
 Cariñoso (1986)
 La Catástrofe de Encarnación (1926)
 Caños (1987)
 De Amor y de Guerra (1997)
 Desde el Tejado (1986)
 Desfile Militar (1926)
 El Que se Aburra Aquí es Porque No Sabe Distraerse (1926)
 Emboscada, campo de concentración (1997)
 En el Infierno del Chaco (1932)
 Estigarribia: Militar y Presidente (1998)
 Estudio Para Una Siesta Paraguaya (2004)
 La Fiesta (1988)
 Las Gaviotas no Hablan Inglés (1996)
 La Guerra del Chaco (1933)
 Horno Ardiente (2002)
 Independencia (1997)
 Manifestación Frente al Congreso (1928)
 Paraguay, Tierra de Promisión (1937)
 Proceso de Cambio (1988)
 El Pueblo (1971)
 Revista Militar en Campo Grande (1926)
 Rutina (1987)
 La Selva Debe Vivir: Los Ache del Ñacunday (1997)
 El Señor Ministro del Interior (1927)
 Sepelio de Eligio Ayala (1930)
 El Siglo Que Se Va (2000)
 Una y Media (2001)
 Vistas del Paraguay (1929)
 Los Yshyr de Karchavalut (1997)

References

External links
 Paraguayan film at the Internet Movie Database

Paraguay

Films